Ram Prasad Singh  is an Indian politician. He was elected to the Lok Sabha, the lower house of the Parliament of India from Bikramganj constituency in 1989 and 1991 as a member of the Janata Dal and from Arrah constituency of Bihar  in 1999 as a member of the Rashtriya Janata Dal.

References

External links
 Official biographical sketch in Parliament of India website

Rashtriya Janata Dal politicians
Lok Sabha members from Bihar
1941 births
India MPs 1989–1991
India MPs 1991–1996
India MPs 1999–2004
Living people
Janata Dal politicians